James Harkins (born 1905) was a Scottish professional footballer who played as an inside forward.

Career statistics
Source:

References

1905 births
People from Paisley, Renfrewshire
Scottish footballers
Association football inside forwards
Dalbeattie Star F.C. players
Petershill F.C. players
Third Lanark A.C. players
Solway Star F.C. players
Luton Town F.C. players
Port Vale F.C. players
Bo'ness F.C. players
Scottish Football League players
English Football League players
Year of death missing